Robert Beith (May 17, 1843, in Darlington Township, Canada West – January 26, 1922) was a Canadian politician and farmer. He was elected to the House of Commons of Canada as a Member of the Liberal Party in 1891 to represent the riding of Durham West. He was re-elected in 1896 then lost in 1900 but re-elected in 1902 after the previous election was declared void on October 6, 1901. He was appointed to the senate of Canada by Sir Wilfrid Laurier on January 15, 1907, to represent the senate division of Bowmanville, Ontario. In Bowmanville, Beith was the owner of Waverley Stables and Stock Farm located on present day Waverley Road.

References

External links
 

1843 births
1922 deaths
Canadian senators from Ontario
Liberal Party of Canada MPs
Liberal Party of Canada senators
Members of the House of Commons of Canada from Ontario
People from Clarington